is a Japanese manga artist, screenwriter and director.

Masaki's career as an animator began in 1963 at Mushi Production, where he was involved in Kimba the White Lion. After a few more works, he left the studio in 1968 and dedicated himself to his work as a mangaka. In 1979, he returned to the film and worked at Studio Madhouse as a director and screenwriter. He directed Natsu e no Tobira and Haguregumo, later wrote the screenplay for the film adaptation of the manga Barefoot Gen and the sci-fi adventure Toki no Tabibito: Time Stranger. In 1986, Masaki retired from anime, although he continued his manga career into the 90s.

Bibliography 
 Jiro ga Yuku (1971)
 Jōhachi Shigure (1972)
 Kiba no Monshō (1972)

Filmography 
 1963: Kimba the White Lion (Animator) 
 1964: Tetsuwan Atom: Uchū no Yūsha (Production Assistant)
 1968: Sabu to Ichi Torimono Hikae (Episode Director)
 1968: Wanpaku Tanteidan (Producer)
 1979: Animation Kikō Marco Polo no Bōken (Episode Director)
 1981: Natsu e no Tobira (Director)
 1982: Haguregumo (Director)
 1983: Barefoot Gen (Director)
 1983: Harmagedon: Genma Taisen (Screenplay, Design)
 1985: Babī ni Kubittake (Design)
 1985: Kamui no Ken (Screenplay)
 1986: Toki no Tabibito – Time Stranger (Director, Screenplay)

References 

Manga artists
1941 births
Living people